The Chevron B19 is a 2-liter sports prototype race car, designed, developed and built by British manufacturer Chevron in 1971. Only 35 cars were built.

References

Chevron racing cars
Sports prototypes
24 Hours of Le Mans race cars
Sports racing cars